Kukhalu may refer to:
 Kukhalu, Azarshahr
 Kukhalu, Bostanabad